Rock Springs is an unincorporated community in St. Francois County, in the U.S. state of Missouri.

The area takes its name from a spring of the same name which in turn was named for its boulder.  A variant name was "Rock Spring".

References

Unincorporated communities in St. Francois County, Missouri
Unincorporated communities in Missouri